55 Days at Peking is a 1963 American epic historical war film dramatizing the siege of the foreign legations' compounds in Peking (now known as Beijing) during the Boxer Rebellion, which took place in China from 1899 to 1901. It was produced by Samuel Bronston for Allied Artists, with a screenplay by Philip Yordan and Bernard Gordon, and with uncredited contributions from Robert Hamer, Julian Halevy, and Ben Barzman. Noel Gerson wrote a screenplay novelization in 1963 under the pseudonym "Samuel Edwards".

The film was directed primarily by Nicholas Ray, although Guy Green and Andrew Marton took over in the latter stages of filming after Ray had fallen ill. Both men were uncredited. It stars Charlton Heston, Ava Gardner, and David Niven, with supporting roles by Flora Robson, John Ireland, Leo Genn, Robert Helpmann, Harry Andrews, and Kurt Kasznar. It also contains the first known screen appearance of future martial arts film star Yuen Siu Tien. Japanese film director Juzo Itami, credited in the film as "Ichizo Itami, appears as Col. Goro Shiba.

55 Days at Peking was released by Allied Artists on May 29, 1963 and received mixed reviews, mainly for its historical inaccuracies and lack of character development. However, the film was praised for its acting, direction, music, action sequences, and production design. In addition to its mixed critical reviews, the film grossed only $10 million at the box office against a budget of $10 million. Despite this, the film was nominated for two Academy Awards. It was director Ray's last film until Lightning Over Water (1980).

Plot

The film is set during the Battle of Peking (1900) (modern day Beijing).

Starvation, widespread in China, is affecting more than 100 million peasants by the summer of 1900. Approximately a thousand foreigners from various western industrialized countries have exploited their positions inside Peking's legations, seeking control of the weakened nation. The Boxers oppose the westerners and the Christian religion and are planning to drive them out.

The turmoil in China worsens as the Boxer secret societies gain tacit approval from the Dowager Empress Cixi. With 13 of China's 18 provinces forced into territorial concessions by those colonial powers, frustration over foreign encroachment boils over when the Empress encourages the Boxers to attack all foreigners in Peking and the rest of China. When the Empress condones the assassination of the German ambassador and "suggests" that the foreigners leave, a violent siege of Peking's foreign legations district erupts. Peking's foreign embassies are gripped by terror, as the Boxers, supported by Imperial troops, set about killing Christians in an anti-western nationalistic fever.

The head of the US military garrison is US Marine Major Matt Lewis, loosely based on the real Major John Twiggs Myers, an experienced China hand who knows local conditions well. A love interest blossoms between him and Baroness Natasha Ivanova, a Russian aristocrat who, it is revealed, had an affair with a Chinese General, causing her Russian husband to commit suicide. The Russian Imperial Minister, who is Natasha's brother-in-law, has revoked her visa in an attempt to recover a valuable necklace. Although the Baroness tries leaving Peking as the siege begins, she is forced by events to return to Major Lewis and volunteers in the hospital, which is battered by the siege and is running out of supplies. To help the defenders, the Baroness exchanges her very valuable jeweled necklace for medical supplies and food, but she is wounded in the process and later dies.

Lewis leads the small contingent of 400 multinational soldiers and American Marines defending the compound. As the siege worsens, Maj. Lewis forms an alliance with the senior officer at the British Embassy, Sir Arthur Robertson, pending the arrival of a British-led relief force. After hearing that the force has been repulsed by Chinese forces, Maj. Lewis and Sir Arthur succeed in their mission to blow up a sizable Chinese ammunition dump.

As the foreign defenders conserve food and water, while trying to save hungry children, the Empress continues plotting with the Boxers by supplying aid from her Chinese troops. Eventually, a foreign relief force from the Eight-Nation Alliance arrives and puts down the Boxer's rebellion. The troops reach Peking on the 55th day and, following the Battle of Peking, lift the siege of the foreign legations. Foreshadowing the demise of the Qing dynasty, rulers of China for the previous two and a half centuries, the Dowager Empress Cixi, alone in her throne room, having gambled her empire and lost, declares repeatedly to herself, "The dynasty is finished".

When the soldiers of the Eight-Nation Alliance have taken control of the city, after routing the Boxers and the remnants of the Imperial Army, Maj. Lewis gathers up his men, having received new orders from his superiors to leave Peking. He stops and circles back to retrieve Teresa, the young, half-Chinese daughter of one of his Marine comrades who was killed during the 55 day siege. Aboard his horse, she and Maj. Lewis leave the city behind, followed by his column of marching Marines.

Cast

 Charlton Heston as Maj. Matt Lewis (based upon John Twiggs Myers)
 Ava Gardner as Baroness Natalie Ivanoff
 David Niven as Sir Arthur Robertson (based upon Sir Claude MacDonald)
 Flora Robson as Empress Dowager Tzu Hsi
 John Ireland as Sgt. Harry
 Leo Genn as Gen. Jung-Lu
 Harry Andrews as Father de Bearn
 Robert Helpmann as Prince Tuan
 Juzo Itami as Col. Goro Shiba
 Kurt Kasznar as Baron Sergei Ivanoff (based upon Mikhail Nikolayevich von Giers)
 Philippe Leroy as Julliard
 Paul Lukas as Dr. Steinfeldt
 Lynne Sue Moon as Teresa
 Elizabeth Sellars as Lady Sarah Robertson
 Massimo Serato as Menotti Garibaldi
 Jacques Sernas as Maj. Bobrinski
 Jerome Thor as Capt. Andy Marshall
 Geoffrey Bayldon as Smythe
 Joseph Furst as Capt. Hanselman
 Walter Gotell as Capt. Hoffman
 Alfredo Mayo as Spanish Minister (dubbed by Robert Rietti, based upon )
 Martin Miller as Hugo Bergmann
 José Nieto as Italian Minister (based upon Giuseppe Salvago Raggi)
 Eric Pohlmann as Baron von Meck (based upon Clemens von Ketteler)
 Aram Stephan as Gaumaire The French minister (based upon Stephen Pichon)
 Robert Urquhart as Capt. Hanley 
 Burt Kwouk as Old Man (voice)

Uncredited roles 

 Fernando Sancho as Belgian Minister (based upon Maurice Joostens)
 Nicholas Ray as U.S. Minister (based upon Edwin H. Conger)
 Félix Dafauce as Dutch Minister (based upon Fridolin Marinus Knobel)
 Carlos Casaravilla as Japanese Minister (based upon Nishi Tokujirō)
 R.S.M. Ronald Brittain as Sgt. Britten
 Alfred Lynch as Gerald
 Michael Chow as Chiang
 George Wang as Kaige, Boxer Chief
 Lucille Soong as Concubine
 Yuen Siu Tien as Court Boxer
 John Moulder-Brown as Tommy
 Milton Reid as Boxer
  as Austrian minister (based upon )

Production

Development
On September 8, 1959, producer Jerry Wald announced he would be producing a film on the Boxer Rebellion tentatively titled The Hell Raisers for 20th Century Fox. He had hoped to star David Niven as a British officer and Stephen Boyd as a United States Marine commander while Hope Lange and France Nuyen were sought for supporting female roles. A few weeks later, on September 24, it was reported that Wald had signed Niven, Boyd, and Nuyen for their respective roles.

Meanwhile, producer Samuel Bronston had enjoyed commercial success from making historical spectacles in Spain, particularly King of Kings (1961), directed by Nicholas Ray, and El Cid (1961), directed by Anthony Mann starring Charlton Heston. In Paris, screenwriters Philip Yordan and Bernard Gordon were brainstorming ideas for potential historical epics. During one story conference, Gordon suggested the Boxer Rebellion having recalled reading a theatrical play while working in the Story Department for Paramount Pictures during the 1940s. Yordan dismissed the idea, but later on having returned from a cruise in London, his wife located a book with a chapter titled "Fifty-five Days at Peking" inside a bookstore and showed it to him. Fascinated with the title alone, Yordan pitched the idea to Gordon, who noted that he had earlier pitched the Boxer Rebellion. In an interview with the Los Angeles Times, Bronston stated he was attracted to the Boxer Rebellion because it showed "the unity of peoples, no matter what their beliefs, in the face of danger. This incident is what the UN symbolizes but has not yet achieved."

In September 1961, Bronston announced he was planning a trilogy of historical epics in Spain, among them was 55 Days at Peking and The Fall of the Roman Empire (1964). For 55 Days at Peking, Alec Guinness was being sought for a lead role while a British director was to be selected. Filming was slated to begin in spring 1962. That same month, Wald told The New York Times that he was unhappy with  Bronston's plans as his project had long been in development, with a final script draft being written by Barre Lyndon; Wald had also wanted Guinness to star in his project. Furthermore, he stated that he had filed an infringement complaint with the Motion Picture Association of America because he had approached Yordan to write a script in 1956. In April 1962, Wald instead sold the project to NBC as a television film, but Wald's death three months later prevented its continuation.

Casting
In September 1961, Heston was initially slated to star in The Fall of the Roman Empire, but he expressed reluctance after having seen the script. In November 1961, Heston was presented with a treatment for 55 Days at Peking, and by this stage, Ray was attached to direct. "It might be an interesting period for a film," wrote Heston. "I'd like to work for Nick, too." However, Heston was still reluctant. In December 1961, following the Madrid premiere of El Cid, during a flight trip back to Los Angeles, Yordan and Ray again pitched the idea to him. Heston agreed to star in the film writing in his journal, "I feel uneasy, but I'm now convinced I must go basically on what confidence I have in a director's talent." Subsequently, Roman Empire was placed on hold as the already-built sets were later demolished and replaced with the Forbidden City sets for 55 Days at Peking.

In March 1962, Bronston told columnist Hedda Hopper that he had hoped Katharine Hepburn would portray Empress Dowager Tzu Hsi. Also, Bronston wanted Ava Gardner for the female lead, although Heston did not want to work with Gardner and instead pushed for Jeanne Moreau. Meanwhile, the role had been offered to Melina Mercouri who turned it down wanting rewrites. On June 11, it was reported that Gardner and Hepburn had joined the cast. In the lobby of the Grand Hotel in Rome, Bronston offered David Niven a role in the film for a salary of $300,000, to which he accepted without seeing a script. On June 12, David Niven's casting was announced. By late June 1962, Flora Robson had replaced Hepburn to portray the Chinese empress while Robert Helpmann would play Prince Tuan.

Writing
In 1977, Ray recalled, "The pressure was tremendous. On a $6 million production, I had no production manager, and a 21-year-old assistant director. No script. I had two artists in my office, one Chinese and one Spanish. I'd describe the scene to them, they'd draw it and then I'd give it to the so-called writers and say, "Write a scene around this?" Prior to filming, Gordon and Ray had worked on a draft in which the former struggled writing as he contracted "colds and the flu and constantly ran a low-grade fever." After four weeks of work, they presented pages of their draft to Yordan, who ordered them to "go back to square one and write the kind of clumsy, impersonal, fat historical opus" that the international distributors wanted." With filming nearly approaching, Yordan suggested hiring Arnaud d'Usseau to assist Gordon with writing some scenes, particularly those with Gardner. Gordon later recalled that d'Usseau worked meticulously slow and "simply couldn't find his way into our script." After a few weeks, d'Usseau left the project with none of his work being used. Shortly after this, blacklisted screenwriter Julian Halevy accepted Gordon's offer to rewrite some scenes, among of which were new scenes for the Empress Dowager.

By May 1962, Gordon delivered a 140-page shooting script, but most of the scenes were merely summarized or sketched in. That same month, Heston received the script, but disapprovingly jotted in his journal that "[t]he love story is very arbitrary, I think; the dialogue primitive." Filming would proceed without a finished script and on-set rewrites were frequent. It had been suggested that a native British screenwriter should revise the dialogue for Niven's character for which Robert Hamer had been hired for the task. Ultimately, his services were later turned away as Hamer had sunken into alcoholism. Yordan then recruited Jon Manchip White to help rework the script, but it did not pan out. Four weeks later into production, Niven threatened to walk off set unless the script was rewritten. Yordan ordered Gordon to write "a Hamlet scene for him, and he'll shut up." Gordon then wrote four to five pages of monologue for Niven's character to self-reflect on his actions. The new scenes were sent to Niven in which he returned to finish filming.

Filming
Principal photography began on July 2, 1962. The film was shot on location in Las Matas. Three thousand extras were required, including 1,500 Chinese. There were estimated to be 300 adult Chinese people in Spain so the rest were imported from all over Europe, particularly London, Rome, Marseilles, and Lisbon.

As production continued, Gardner became difficult during the shoot, often turning up late, disliking the script, and drinking heavily. One day, she walked off set claiming an extra had taken a photograph of her. Ultimately, the idea to write Gardner out of the film came from screenwriter Ben Barzman, who had rewritten El Cid. According to Heston, Yordan had written a death scene in which the Baroness dies of shrapnel wounds. By the time the scene was shot, Gardner struggled to remember her lines. Heston then suggested giving her lines to Paul Lukas, who was playing a physician.

On September 11, 1962, Ray was hospitalized after having a heart attack. At this point, production had fallen six weeks behind schedule with Gardner's role being nearly complete, but significant scenes for Heston and Niven had yet to be shot. To replace him, Heston suggested Guy Green, who had previously directed him in Diamond Head (1963), to finish the remaining scenes between him and Gardner. Green subsequently left the production, and by October 1962, directorial duties were transferred to Andrew Marton, who was directing second unit. Marton reflected, "When I came onboard, I thought the picture was very shallow, just action, action, action and there was no meaning. I wrote a new beginning and a new ending and submitted them to management—who consisted of Bronston and Michael Wasynski ... Anyway, they said 'NO!' with a capital N, capital O. And I was very unhappy." Regardless, Marton invited director John Ford onto the set, who had advised him to shoot the sequences with no hesitation. Heston finished his scenes on October 20, 1962, for which he wrote in his journal, "What I have learned from this, I hope permanently, is never start a film without a good finished script." Principal photography ended on November 15, 1962.

Release
In May 1962, it was reported that Allied Artists, who had earlier distributed El Cid, had signed to distribute 55 Days in Peking in the United States. Bronston had raised the money by first pre-selling the film to distributors on the basis of the topic, and the involvement of Heston and Ray.

On May 28, 1963, the film received a gala invitational premiere at the Beverly Theater.

Home media
Universal Studios Home Entertainment released the film on DVD February 28, 2001. A UK Blu-ray from Anchor Bay Entertainment was released in April 2014.

Reception

Critical response
Bosley Crowther of The New York Times described the film as:  Gene Arneel of Variety praised the production design and Jack Hildeyard's cinematography, but also felt the script "plays interestingly but somehow lacks appropriate power. The characterizations don't have the intensity of the struggle." Philip K. Scheuer, reviewing for the Los Angeles Times, wrote that "For sheer color magnificence—photographed by Jack Hildeyard in Super Technirama 70—it is as breathtaking as El Cid. Only this time, instead of medieval Spain, it is the China of 1900, complete with Forbidden City and surrounding legations. It should hold and fascinate spectators for its two-and-a-half hours of sheer, pell-mell movie making, even though characters are stereotypes whose melodramatics are as dated as the period itself."

Time magazine felt "Pictorially, the film is magnificent, and some of the handsomest scenes—an orange sun rising over the peaks of the Forbidden City, midnight pyrotechnics as the Imperial arsenal blows up, the gates of the great Tartar Wall being stormed by Boxers in scarlet turbans—are almost as good as the evocative paintings by Water-colorist Dong Kingman, which open and close the picture. It was doubtless ghastly to wait 55 days at Peking until a troop of international reinforcements arrived, and the moviegoer who goes through the whole siege in two hours and 30 minutes comes out feeling lucky." Awarding the film four complete stars, Dorothy Masters of the New York Daily News wrote: "A powerful drama of global interest, the film has integrity, a component frequently lost in the razzle-dazzle dangled by so many multi-million-dollar colossals."

At the review aggregator website Rotten Tomatoes, the film holds an approval rating of 58% based on 7 reviews, with an average rating of 5.43/10.

Box office
55 Days at Peking was a commercial disaster in the United States. Produced on a then-enormous budget of $10 million, the film's domestic gross was $10 million, earning only $5 million in theatrical rentals. It was the 20th highest-grossing film of 1963. The figures quoted ignore foreign box office receipts where the film was much more successful than in the United States.

Academy Award nominations
Music from this film was responsible for two nominations at the 1964 Academy Awards. Dimitri Tiomkin and Paul Francis Webster were nominated for Best Original Song for "So Little Time", and Tiomkin was nominated for Best Music Score – Substantially Original.

Legacy
55 Days at Peking contains the first known occurrence of the phrase "Let China sleep. For when she wakes, the world will tremble", which is often mistakenly attributed to Napoleon Bonaparte. While appearing in the film to a script by Bernard Gordon, the phrase did not appear in the subsequent books versions by Noel Gerson (written under the pseudonym Samuel Edwards).

Comic book adaptation
 Gold Key: 55 Days at Peking (September 1963)
 René Bratonne also made a French newspaper comic adaptation of this film, assisted by Pierre Leguen and Claude Pascal; they who worked under the pseudonym "Jack de Brown".

See also

 List of American films of 1963
 List of historical drama films of Asia

References
Citations

Bibliography

External links

 
 
 
 

1960s adventure drama films
1960s historical films
1963 films
Allied Artists films
American adventure drama films
American epic films
American historical films
Boxer Rebellion
Cultural depictions of Empress Dowager Cixi
1960s English-language films
Films about the United States Marine Corps
Films adapted into comics
Films directed by Andrew Marton
Films directed by Guy Green
Films directed by Nicholas Ray
Films scored by Dimitri Tiomkin
Films set in 1900
Films set in Beijing
Films set in the Qing dynasty
Films shot in Madrid
Films shot in Spain
Samuel Bronston Productions films
Siege films
1963 drama films
1960s American films